Bloody Knuckles is an album released by American blues rock artist Iron Mike Norton. It was released June 4, 2013, on GFO Records and distributed by INgrooves.

Production
Bloody Knuckles was recorded at The Gutbuckit in Gainesville, Missouri, and produced by Iron Mike Norton.

Track listing

Personnel

Musicians
Iron Mike Norton – Slide guitar (all tracks except 8), Guitar (all tracks), vocals (all tracks), Bass guitar (tracks 4 & 7). Drums (all tracks), Roland TR-808 (tracks 2, 8)

Production
Iron Mike Norton – producer, mixing engineer

References

External links
 Bloody Knuckles at Discgos
 Bloody Knuckles on Musicbrainz
 Bloody Knuckles Lyrics on Musixmatch

2013 albums
Iron Mike Norton albums
Roots rock albums